The year 1968 was the 187th year of the Rattanakosin Kingdom of Thailand. It was the 23rd year in the reign of King Bhumibol Adulyadej (Rama IX), and is reckoned as year 2511 in the Buddhist Era.

Incumbents
King: Bhumibol Adulyadej 
Crown Prince: (vacant)
Prime Minister: Thanom Kittikachorn
Supreme Patriarch: Ariyavongsagatanana V

 
Years of the 20th century in Thailand
Thailand
Thailand
1960s in Thailand